U.S. Route 22 (US 22) is an east–west U.S. highway that stretches from Cincinnati, Ohio, in the west, to Newark, New Jersey, in the east.

The portion from the Pennsylvania Route 66 (PA 66) interchange near Delmont east to the Interstate 81 (I-81) interchange near Harrisburg is the main part of Corridor M of the Appalachian Development Highway System, although a large portion near the center of the route has not yet been upgraded to a four-lane divided highway.

Route description
 

US 22 carries multiple names as it progresses across the state, including the William Penn Highway and the Lehigh Valley Thruway. Several sections of the road are freeway, including the Lehigh Valley Thruway.

US 22 crosses into Pennsylvania from West Virginia as the William Penn Highway. It becomes concurrent with US 30 (Lincoln Highway) and then west of Pittsburgh also with I-376, as the Penn Lincoln Parkway.  It continues as such through Pittsburgh and beyond the end of the US 30 concurrency, and when I-376 reaches its eastern end at the Pennsylvania Turnpike junction with I-76, US 22 resumes as the William Penn Highway again (with Murrysville as a control city on signs).

It begins the long climb eastwards up the Allegheny Plateau towards the gaps of the Allegheny Front. During the last part of its eastbound ascent, it becomes known as the Admiral Peary Highway from Armagh in Indiana County.  It crosses the Eastern Continental Divide in Tunnelhill, where it descends through the Blair Gap and down into the Altoona area along the same valley once used by the historic Allegheny Portage Railroad. 

From Duncansville to Mount Union, US 22 is a two-lane road with occasional passing and truck-climbing lanes, and it passes through the business district of Huntingdon, where it is three lanes (one lane each way with a turning lane in the middle). It becomes concurrent with US 522 near Mount Union and remains a two-lane road. The US 522 concurrency continues until Lewistown.

US 22 bypasses the downtown area of Lewistown as a four-lane limited access highway and becomes concurrent with US 322, continuing as a four-lane limited access highway along the Juniata and Susquehanna rivers until Harrisburg.  In Harrisburg (with the US 322 concurrency ending at I-81), it continues as North Cameron Street, Arsenal Boulevard, Herr Street, Walnut Street, Jonestown Road, and Allentown Boulevard.  In Fredericksburg, US 22 becomes concurrent with I-78 for a  stretch before splitting off on to the Lehigh Valley Thruway.

Lehigh Valley Thruway

The Lehigh Valley Thruway is a  freeway portion of US 22 from the eastern end of the I-78/US 22 concurrency in Kuhnsville, west of Allentown, to the New Jersey state line in Easton. The highway runs through the Lehigh Valley, traveling just to the north of Allentown and Bethlehem and passing through Easton.

Traffic on the Lehigh Valley Thruway is often heavy at rush hour, particularly near the PA 145 interchange in Whitehall Township. The series of sharp curves is locally known as "Cemetery Curve", and because of it, the speed limit is lowered to 45 mph at PA 248 and then lowered to 35 mph around the sharpest part of the curves.  At the interchange with Bushkill Street, US 22 becomes an elevated highway until crossing into New Jersey. The speed limit drops once again to 25 mph while crossing the Easton–Phillipsburg Toll Bridge.

History

The William Penn Highway was organized as an alternative to the Lincoln Highway being parallel to the Pennsylvania Railroad west of Harrisburg.  The route's New York Extension was adopted in 1916.  The Pennsylvania Department of Highways assigned the PA 3 designation to this road in 1924, and in 1926 it became part of US 22 when the United States Highway System was formed.

East of Harrisburg 

The first alignment of the William Penn Highway became problematic for motorists in Lebanon along the current US 422; Reading via US 22 and US 222 and Allentown on Hamilton Street (present-day PA 222).  The highway continued through Allentown on Hanover Avenue and through Bethlehem on Broad Street, Linden Street, and Easton Avenue.

PA 43 was aligned as a bypass, north of the Pennsylvania Dutch Country, that ran from US 22, US 11, and PA 5 in Harrisburg east to PA 12 in Bethlehem. From Harrisburg, this route followed modern-day US 22 to Paxtonia, then Jonestown Road to Jonestown and modern-day Old Route 22, Airport Road, and Main Street through Fredericksburg. East of here to Fogelsville, the route is variously called Old Route 22, Shartlesville Road, and Hex Highway. The route from Fogelsville to the Allentown line, now Main Street and Tilghman Street, was designated LR 443 in 1925 before being incorporated into this route. The route entered Harrisburg by Liberty Street and connected with the William Penn Highway through 17th Street. The New York Times was recommending use of this cutoff by early 1931.  On June 8, 1931, the American Association of State Highway Officials came to a resolution for the traffic problem, by replacing the PA 43 corridor with US 22.  The Pennsylvania Department of Highways moved the William Penn Highway name to match.  The state deleted a concurrency with PA 43 and what was then US 309 and truncated PA 43 to Susquehanna Street and Broadway from Allentown to Bethlehem.  Signs were changed to reflect the new designations on May 31, 1932, with the new route designations officially in place on June 1, 1932.

Tilghman Street was eventually connected directly from Cetronia to Allentown by a bridge over Cedar Creek; Tilghman Street (west of the Lehigh River) and Union Boulevard (east of the river) were joined in 1929 by a bridge. By 1936, US 22 had been moved from its Hamilton Street and Broad Street alignment to Tilghman Street and Union Boulevard through Allentown and Bethlehem. From Bethlehem to Easton, an alternate route was formed along Goepp Street, Pembroke Road, and Freemansburg Avenue. With the construction of a new bridge over the Delaware River in 1938, Prospect Avenue, Pearl Street, and Snyder Street in Easton were incorporated into US 22. A new alignment from Fredericksburg to Paxtonia was built in the early 1940s. When the Lehigh Valley Thruway was completed in 1954, US 22 was moved onto it; its old alignment was redesignated State Route 1002 through Lehigh County. With the completion of I-78, US 22 was moved onto that highway from Fredericksburg to Kuhnsville. The former alignment, although no longer a major state highway, is still well traveled by those who live in the vicinity.

Originally, I-78 would have continued with the US 22 concurrency on the Lehigh Valley Thruway into New Jersey, and I-178 and I-378, serving Allentown and Bethlehem, respectively. Due to opposition in Phillipsburg, New Jersey, on the building of a new highway through the town, PennDOT and NJDOT decided to reroute I-78 to the south and allow US 22 to remain on the limited-access highway, which, after going through a series of sharp, potentially dangerous curves in Easton and crossing the Delaware River into New Jersey, becomes an at-grade divided highway in Phillipsburg.

West of Harrisburg 

The origins of this section of US 22 date back to the early 1800s, with the chartering of the Harrisburg, Lewistown, Huntingdon and Pittsburgh Turnpike in 1807, following the course of what would become US 22 from Harrisburg to Pittsburgh, providing a more northerly alternative to the Harrisburg and Pittsburgh Turnpike chartered the year prior. Support for the turnpike was lacking along its route, and so to foster a sense of locality to the road the company was broken up in the subsequent years into five sections: the Huntingdon, Cambria, and Indiana in 1810 (terminating at Huntingdon and Blairsville); the New Alexandria and Conemaugh in 1816 (Blairsville to New Alexandria); the Pittsburgh and New Alexandria Turnpike in 1816; and the Harrisburg and Millerstown, Millerstown and Lewistown, and Lewistown and Huntingdon Turnpikes in 1821. In their own times, these companies constructed a highway across the Appalachians collectively called the Northern Pike, but all folded with competition from the Main Line of Public Works, and later the Pennsylvania Railroad.

In its earliest years, US 22 deviated from the original course of the William Penn Highway in a few notable places. With the construction of the Boulevard of the Allies in the early 1920s, the highway was rerouted to service this thoroughfare. This alignment entered Pittsburgh on modern day PA 8, then made its way downtown by Dallas Avenue, Wilkins Avenue, Beeler Street, Forbes Street, the Boulevard of the Allies, and Second Street. The highway then followed the old Pittsburgh and Steubenville Pike to Ohio. With the construction of the Penn-Lincoln Parkway in the late 1950s, both US 22 and US 30 were shifted to the new highway. 

Further east, where the William Penn Highway deviated from the Northern Pike between Ebensburg and Water Street to service Altoona and Tyrone, the Northern Pike was restored as the main east–west thoroughfare, while US 220 was chosen to service these cities. A few notable deviations from this include Turkey Valley Road near Canoe Creek Lake, and a bend servicing Williamsburg via modern-day PA 866 and SR 2015, which both deviated from the Northern Pike. These were later christened as PA 303 and PA 203 respectively when the highway was restored to the Northern Pike. Near the Susquehanna River, before an alignment along the Juniata River had been constructed, the highway serviced New Bloomfield and Meck's Corner by modern-day PA 34 and PA 274; while US 22 was shifted north, this alignment still held its old designation of PA 3 for some time afterwards.

Future
In 2011, it was announced that plans were being resurrected to widen US 22 from Allentown to Bethlehem.  Part of the plan is to reconstruct the Lehigh River Bridge. The plan's cost is between $240 million to $320 million. In late 2019, plans to study a potential upgrade to an interstate were announced since additional federal funding is available for interstate construction.

Major intersections

See also

Special routes of U.S. Route 22

References

External links

Pennsylvania Highways: US 22
US 22 at AARoads.com
Pennsylvania Roads – US 22

 Pennsylvania
Roads in the Harrisburg, Pennsylvania area
Transportation in Washington County, Pennsylvania
Transportation in Allegheny County, Pennsylvania
Transportation in Westmoreland County, Pennsylvania
Transportation in Indiana County, Pennsylvania
Transportation in Cambria County, Pennsylvania
Transportation in Blair County, Pennsylvania
Transportation in Huntingdon County, Pennsylvania
Transportation in Mifflin County, Pennsylvania
Transportation in Juniata County, Pennsylvania
Transportation in Perry County, Pennsylvania
Transportation in Dauphin County, Pennsylvania
Transportation in Lebanon County, Pennsylvania
Transportation in Berks County, Pennsylvania
Transportation in Lehigh County, Pennsylvania
Transportation in Northampton County, Pennsylvania
22